Sir Cyril Atkinson (9 May 1874 – 29 January 1967) was an English barrister and Conservative Party politician.  He served as Member of Parliament (MP) for Altrincham in Cheshire from 1924 to 1933, when he resigned to become a High Court judge.

Private life
Atkinson was the son of Leonard William Atkinson, from Cheshire. He married Kathleen O'Neill Longridge in 1900. Their son Fenton Atkinson was born in 1906; he was later a judge in the High Court and then the Court of Appeal.

After his first wife's death in 1947, Atkinson married Florence Morton Henderson in 1948; she was the widow of Colonel Michael Henderson.

Career
Atkinson was called to the Bar in 1897 and was appointed King's Counsel in 1913.

In 1924, Atkinson was chosen by Altrincham Unionists to be their parliamentary candidate for the seat they had lost to the Liberals in 1923. He did not have long to wait before the 1924 general election, and he won the seat on a swing of 15%.

At the 1929 general election, he again faced Robert Alstead, the Liberal he had unseated in 1924. The Labour party chose to field a candidate for the first time since 1922, which made Atkinson's job of holding the seat easier, giving him a majority of 18%.

He was returned unopposed in 1931, and in 1933 he resigned from the House of Commons on being appointed a High Court judge, serving in the King's Bench Division until he retired in 1948.  He was Treasurer of Lincoln's Inn in 1942.

He served as a member of the Church Assembly (the forerunner to the General Synod) from 1950 to 1955.

Arms

References 

 National Portrait Gallery
 ‘ATKINSON, Hon. Sir Cyril’, Who Was Who, A & C Black, an imprint of Bloomsbury Publishing plc, 1920–2015; online edn, Oxford University Press, 2014 ; online edn, April 2014 accessed 27 July 2015

External links 
 

1874 births
1967 deaths
Conservative Party (UK) MPs for English constituencies
UK MPs 1924–1929
UK MPs 1929–1931
UK MPs 1931–1935
Queen's Bench Division judges
Knights Bachelor